Ashi may refer to:
 Ashi, the Zoroastrian concept of "reward, recompense"
 Ashi, Iran, a village in Iran
 Ashi River in China
 Rav Ashi, a Jewish religious scholar
 Ashi (title), a Bhutanese honorific title meaning "Lady"
 Ashi Productions, a Japanese anime studio
 Ashi, a fictional character in the fifth season of Samurai Jack

ASHI may be an acronym of:
 Amaya School of Home Industries, a vocational school in the Philippines
 American Safety and Health Institute
American Society for Histocompatibility and Immunogenetics
 American Society of Home Inspectors